We Are All Murderers (also known as Are We All Murderers?) is a 1952 French film written and directed by André Cayatte, a former attorney. It tells the story of René, a young man from the slums, trained by the French Resistance in World War II to kill Germans. He continues to kill long after the war has ended, as it is all he knows.

It was entered into the 1952 Cannes Film Festival and won the Special Jury Prize.

Plot
René Le Guen (Marcel Mouloudji) is a former resistance fighter trained as a young man as a professional killer. After World War II, he has no qualms in applying these skills and is arrested for murder. Convicted and condemned to death, he is held in a prison cell with other murderers sentenced to death. Men to be guillotined are taken out at night, so they wait in fear and only sleep after dawn. While Le Guen's lawyer (Claude Laydu) tries to achieve a pardon for his client, three of Le Guen's fellow inmates are executed, one by one, in the course of the film.

Cayatte used his films to reveal the inequities and injustice of the French system, and protested against capital punishment.

Cast
 Marcel Mouloudji - René Le Guen
 Raymond Pellegrin - Gino Bollini
 Antoine Balpêtré - Dr. Albert Dutoit
 Julien Verdier - Bauchet
 Claude Laydu - Philippe Arnaud
 Georges Poujouly - Michel Le Guen
 Jacqueline Pierreux - Yvonne Le Guen (version française)
 Lucien Nat - L'avocat général
 Louis Arbessier - L'avocat du tribunal pour enfants
 René Blancard - Albert Pichon
 Léonce Corne - Le colonel instructeur
 Henri Crémieux - L'avocat de Bauchet
 Jean Daurand - Girard, l'homme dans la cabine téléphonique
 Yvonne de Bray - La chiffonnière
 Guy Decomble - Un inspecteur
 Liliane Maigné – Rachel

Honors
It won the Special Jury Prize at the Cannes Film Festival in 1952.

References

External links

1952 films
French black-and-white films
1952 drama films
Films directed by André Cayatte
French drama films
1950s French-language films
1950s French films